The 1934 Nebraska gubernatorial election was held on November 6, 1934, and featured state engineer Robert L. Cochran, a Democrat, defeating Republican nominee, newspaper publisher and former state legislator Dwight Griswold.

Democratic primary

Candidates
William B. Banning, former member of the Nebraska Senate
Terry Carpenter, U.S. Representative
Robert L. Cochran, state engineer
Frank J. Klopping, member of the Nebraska House of Representatives
Maud Edgerton Nuquist, secretary-treasurer of the director's council of the General Federation of Women's Clubs
Eugene D. O'Sullivan, attorney
W. F. Porter
John F. Rohn, Mayor of Fremont
J. G. Stroble

Results

Republican primary

Candidates
 George B. Clark
 Dwight Griswold, newspaper publisher and former member of the Nebraska Legislature
 Theodore W. Metcalfe, former Lieutenant Governor
 Christian A. Sorensen, former Attorney General
 George W. Sterling

Results

General election

Results

References

Gubernatorial
1934
Nebraska
November 1934 events